Mora Dhansiri is a tributary of the Dhansiri River, the main river of Golaghat District in the state of Assam, India. It originates from Laisang peak of Nagaland and passes through Kaziranga National Park.

Rivers of Assam
Rivers of Nagaland
Rivers of India